Tonin may refer to:

Places 
 Tonin, Poland, a village in the administrative district of Gmina Sośno, in north-central Poland

People 
Tonin (name)

Other uses 
 Tonin', a studio album by The Manhattan Transfer
 Tōkoyasaka Jinja tōnin gyōji,  festival celebrated in Oga and Katagami, Akita Prefecture, Japan

See also 

Tonie
Tonio (name)
Tonina (disambiguation)
 Tonon
Tonic (disambiguation)
Toni (disambiguation)
Tonkin (disambiguation)
Tonino (disambiguation)
Toxin (disambiguation)
Tonn (disambiguation)
Tonia (disambiguation)